The "tourist guy" was an internet phenomenon that featured a photograph of a tourist on the observation deck of the World Trade Center digitally altered to show a plane about to hit the tower in the background during the September 11 attacks. The photo went viral as many manipulated pictures spread online. The man in the photograph was identified as Hungarian Péter Guzli, who took the photo in 1997. Guzli said he edited the photo as a joke for his friends and did not realize it would spread across the Internet.

He is also called numerous other names, including the "accidental tourist" (a reference to the novel and film The Accidental Tourist), "Waldo" (a reference to Where's Waldo?), the "WTC Guy", and the "tourist of death".

Origin
Shortly after 9/11, an image surfaced on the internet, purportedly from a camera found in the debris of the World Trade Center. The image showed a man, dressed in a wool cap, heavy jacket, and backpack, standing on the observation deck of the World Trade Center. Below him, a jet plane can be seen flying towards the building. Because of its closeness and low altitude, it seems certain to collide with the tower. The picture purported to be one taken mere moments before the attacks on the World Trade Center began.

Inconsistencies
Hoaxapedia from Museum of Hoaxes' online encyclopedia listed some of the inconsistencies that ultimately confirmed that the photograph was a hoax. These include:

 The temperature in New York City on September 11, 2001 was pleasant. It was  the morning of the attacks, yet the man in the photo was wearing heavy clothing consistent with winter weather.
 The man would have been standing on the South Tower, which had an observation deck, yet the North Tower, without such a deck, was the first to be hit. It is unlikely that anyone would be posing for a photo after the North Tower was hit.
 United Airlines Flight 175 crashed into the South Tower from the south. However, it is evident from the fact that Midtown Manhattan is in the background behind the man that the plane in this photo is approaching from the north, consistent with American Airlines Flight 11. The plane in the picture clearly displays the American Airlines livery on its nose.
 Both planes that were flown into the towers were Boeing 767s, whereas a Boeing 757 is shown in this photo.
 The plane likely would have been blurred in the photo due to its high speed before impact.
 United Airlines Flight 175 crashed when it was tilted. Here it is seen going forward, like Flight 11.
 The photographer was not likely to proceed with taking the picture after seeing the airplane about to crash into the building.
 If the photo was taken on a digital camera, the camera would not have likely survived such a fall.
 The observation deck on the South Tower normally opened at 9:30 a.m. but Flight 175 struck the south tower at 9:02:59 a.m.
 The white balance of the two photographs is far off. If the plane were part of the photograph, it would appear more yellow. This can be confirmed by comparison with the deck rail at the bottom of the photograph; the plane had nearly the same tint as the deck, while in the photo the two parts show obviously different color.
 The image’s timestamp appears to have been added during post editing with a paint program, rather than one created by an actual camera.
 Shadows of certain items are not cast correctly in the photo. This proves that the image was edited, as certain objects in the image do not cast shadows corresponding to the same light sources in the picture.

Later appearances

The picture became a widely known example of an internet meme. As its fame spread, other people started to use the same tourist for other pictures. They included the tourist present at the sinking of the RMS Titanic, at the John F. Kennedy assassination, the destruction of Air France Flight 4590 and at the Hindenburg disaster. In one version, the aircraft has been replaced with a Melbourne tram. Other pictures show him present at disastrous events in movies, like the destruction of the White House in Independence Day, Godzilla demolishing Tokyo, or as the bus driver in Speed. There are also pictures of him together with people from other famous digitally manipulated pictures, such as Bert from Sesame Street or a man holding a huge cat. There even appeared a picture of the Yalta conference where Stalin is replaced by the man with the cat, with the tourist and Bert in the background.

Identity
The first person who claimed to be the tourist was the Brazilian businessman José Roberto Penteado. When Penteado started to get media attention, including an offer to be in a Volkswagen commercial, a 25-year-old Hungarian man, Péter Guzli, came forward as the real tourist. Guzli says, however, that he does not want publicity and did not originally release his last name.

Guzli took the photo on November 28, 1997, and was also responsible for the initial edit. He said he edited the image for a few friends, not realizing it would spread so quickly across the Internet. He first provided the original undoctored photo and several other photos from the same series as proof to a Hungarian newspaper. Later on, the show Wired News examined the evidence and confirmed that Guzli was the real tourist guy.

References

External links 
Tourist Guy on Snopes
WTC Tourist AKA | Waldo History & Gallery
GreaterThings.com
TouristOfDeath.com 
Original Aircraft Photo

Internet memes
September 11 attacks
Internet humor
Hungarian photographers
Urban legends
Color photographs
Internet hoaxes
Photography forgeries
2001 hoaxes
Photographs of the United States
2001 works
2001 in art
2000s photographs